Station Horizon is a Swiss TV show that originally aired on RTS Un. It is a dramedy set in Valais, in a small town inspired by American culture. Internationally, Station Horizon is broadcast on SBS On Demand in Australia, and Netflix in the United States. The series was shown at the 2015 Montreal World Film Festival.

Cast 
 Bernard Yerlès as Joris Fragnière
 Roland Vouilloz as Raymond Héritier
 Gaspard Boesch as Charly Fragnière
 Alexandra Vandernoot as Nicole Héritier
 Marie Fontannaz as Jessy Rouiller
 Lavinia Longhi as Cheyenne Morales
 Baptiste Gilliéron as Bernard Héritier
 Klaudio Hila as Elvis Behrami
 Mélissa Aymon as Axelle Fragnière
 Anna Pieri as Suzy Fragnière
 Yoann Blanc as Karl-Heinz Imboden
 Charlotte Nagel as Géraldine Germanier
 Jean-Marc Morel as Martin Troillet also known as Père Maurice
 Jean-Pierre Gos as Henri Lambiel also known as Riton
 Thierry Meury as Jean-Michel Germanier also known as Jean-Mi
 Maria Mettral as Freddie Rouiller
 Baptiste Coustenoble as Werner Besse
 Berner Biermeier as Willy Frösch
 Pierre Aucaigne as George Lathion
 Christian Mukuna as Yannick Bolomey also known as Yaya
 James Gattuso as Léonard
 Yann Schmidhalter as Gabi
 Hélène Patricio as Raluca
 Antonio Buil as Jésus Pinto

References

External links

2015 Swiss television series debuts
French-language television shows
2015 Swiss television series endings
2010s Swiss television series
Radio Télévision Suisse original programming